Don't Tell the Band, is the seventh studio album released by the Athens, GA based band Widespread Panic. It was released on June 19, 2001, in two forms, a single disc and a double disc release. It was the second release through the band's own label, Widespread Records, in conjunction with UK-based label Sanctuary Records. The album covered a wide variety of styles, from rock to Latin and grunge to soul, yet did not depart from this jam band's signature sound.

Randall Bramblett, a solo musician and member of Steve Winwood's touring band, joined Widespread Panic on the tenor saxophone for a cover of Firehose's Sometimes. Big Wooly Mammoth, a long-time crowd favorite sung by John "JoJo" Herman, was finally brought to the studio for this release. Unknown at the time, this would be Michael Houser's last studio album with Widespread Panic, before his cancer-related death in 2002.

Songs from Disc Two comprise the first five tracks of the band's June 2002 release Live in the Classic City and are from the opening of the band's April 1, 2000 performance at the Classic Center Theater in Athens, GA.  Track 1, "Action Man," appears in its original instrumental form unlike the album version, which contains lyrics. The songs "Action Man" & "Give" also appeared in the EA Sports video game NASCAR 2001.

The album reached a peak position of #57 on the Billboard 200 chart. The album also reached a peak position of #12 on the Top Internet Albums chart.

Track listing 
All songs by Widespread Panic unless otherwise noted.

Personnel
Widespread Panic
John Bell – guitar, vocals
John Hermann –	keyboards, vocals
Michael Houser – guitars, vocals
Todd Nance – drums, vocals
Domingo S. Ortiz – percussion
Dave Schools –	bass

Guest Performers
Randall Bramblett – tenor sax on "Sometimes"
John Keane – pedal steel guitar on "This Part of Town", additional guitar noises on "Casa Del Grillo"

Production
John Keane – engineer, Mixing
Ken Love – mastering
Doug Trantow –	engineer, Mixing
Flournoy Holmes – artwork, Design

References

External links
Widespread Panic website
Everyday Companion
[ All Music entry, single disc]
[ All Music entry, double disc]

2001 albums
Widespread Panic albums
Albums produced by John Keane (record producer)